Photo is a 2006 Indian Telugu-language romantic thriller film directed by Siva Nageswara Rao and starring Anand, Anjali and Muktha (Her Telugu debut ) . This film marks the film debut of the lead actor and actresses Anand Anjali and Mukhtha
The movie is based on Nandu (credited as Anand), Anjali and  Muktha.  Photo is reportedly based on the 2004 Thai film Shutter.

This film is the first directorial venture of comedy director Nageswara Rao in the thriller genre. The film was released on 1 September 2006.

Plot

Cast 

Anand as Siddhartha  a.k.a. Siddhu
Anjali as Bhanu 
Mukta as Swapna 
Jayasudha as Swapna's mother
Nutan Prasad as a shaman
Tanikella Bharani 
Dharmavarapu Subramanyam
L. B. Sriram
M. S. Narayana
Brahmanandam
Ali
Venu Madhav
Raghu Babu
Krishna Bhagawan
Kondavalasa 
Suman Setty
Duvvasi Mohan
Kallu Chidambaram
Jenny
 Tadivelu
 Master Siva Varma
 Dr. Srinivasa Rao
 Raghava
 Banda Jyothy 
 Jayavani

Production 
After Siva Nageswara Rao liked a story in Hasam magazine, he asked the writer of the article, Karlapalem Hanumantha Rao, to develop a story for him. Nageswara Rao claimed that the story was based on a true incident that happened in Coastal Andhra in 2004. However, independent sources identify the film to be based on 2004 Thai film Shutter.

The film marks Nageswara Rao debut as a producer. Chennai-based model Anjali made her acting debut with this film.

Release and reception
The film released on 1 September 2006. A special preview show was arranged on 30 August 2006.

Griddaluru Gopalrao of Zamin Ryot felt that the film was poorly made. Gopalrao stated that the storyline was novel but the film faltered in screenplay and execution. He appreciated the performances of Anand and Anjali. A critic from Full Hyderabad wrote that "The film is slow all through, and especially in the second half". Kishore of Nowrunning gave the film a rating of one out of five stars and opined that "Overall the movie probably would end up being the most boring movie of the year". A critic from Indiaglitz stated that "The director was able to extract the best of their performance and yes, Anand, Anjali and Mukta gave their best. Graphic works were also up to the mark. As producers are after Sivanageswara Rao to make comedy flicks and the director out to bring out a thriller, he himself produced the film and also succeeded in it".

References

Indian remakes of Thai films
2000s Telugu-language films
2006 thriller films
Indian romance films
Indian thriller films